David Leonard Rayvern Allen (5 February 1938 – 9 October 2014) was a cricket writer and historian, as well as a radio producer and presenter, a speaker and a musician. His radio productions won awards including the 1991 Prix Italia for Who Pays the Piper, a collaboration with Richard Stilgoe. He died aged 76 in 2014.

Life and career
Allen was born in Streatham, London, and went to school at Sir Walter St John's School, Battersea. He gained external music diplomas from the Royal Academy of Music and the Guildhall School of Music and Drama in London.

Allen spent his working life as a radio producer with the BBC, working on a wide range of programmes before retiring in 1993. Later, as a member of the MCC's Arts and Library committee, he was largely responsible for the club's Audio Archive Project, a collection of several hundred interviews with cricket people; he conducted more than a hundred of the interviews himself.

He won several awards for his cricket biographies. His Wisden obituary said of them that he was "conscientious, readable, judicious" and that he "did not flinch from the less agreeable aspects of his subjects' characters".

He married Rosemary Clark in 1966. They had two daughters.

Works

Radio
King Vidor profile BBC Radio 1978 (presenter)
Billy Wilder profile BBC Radio 1978 (interviewer)
Who Could Ask for Anything More? A Celebration of Ira Gershwin BBC Radio 2 1996 (producer)

With Richard Stilgoe
Used Notes
Music on the Brain
The Singing Wheelchair
Hamburger Weekend (1984)
Who Pays the Piper (1991)

Cricket-related (partial list)
A Song for Cricket (1981) 
The "Punch" Book of Cricket (1985) 
Cricket on the Air: A Selection from Fifty Years of Radio Broadcasts (1985) BBC Books 
Arlott on Wine (1987)  (with John Arlott)
Peter Pan and Cricket (1988) Constable & Co 
Sir Aubrey: A Biography of C. Aubrey Smith - England Cricketer, West End Actor, Hollywood Film Star (1st 1982), J. W. McKenzie ,  (2nd 1987), ; augmented edition: limited to 150 (2005), 2010: 
The Guinness Book of Cricket Extras (1988) (with Honor Head), Guinness Publishing 
Arlott: The Authorised Biography (2004) 
Jim: The Life of E. W. Swanton (2004) 
The Second Lord's Cricket Ground: Home of MCC, 1811-1813 (2006) MCC
Songs of Cricket (2011)  mentor for this Signum CD by cantabile - the London Quartet with guests Rory Bremner, Tim Rice, Richard Stilgoe, Alex L'Estrange, Eliza Lumley and Chris Hatt

Other
Punches on the Page: A Boxing Anthology (1998) 
Living with London (2012) Methuen  (with Nick Botting)

References

1938 births
2014 deaths
People from Streatham
People educated at Sir Walter St John's Grammar School For Boys
British radio producers
Cricket historians and writers
English biographers
20th-century British businesspeople